Naseer is a given name and surname, commonly found in the Arabic language. Alternative spellings of this name, possibly due to transliteration, include Naser, Nasir, Naseer, and Nacer. It may refer to:

Given name
 Naseer Aruri (1934–2015), American professor
 Naseer Malik (1950–1999), Pakistani cricketer
 Naseer Shamma (born 1963), Arab Iraqi musician and oud player
 Naseeruddin Shah (born 1950), Pashtun Indian Parallel Cinema actor

Surname
 Mukhthar Naseer (born 1979), Maldivian footballer
 Munir Bin Naseer, Pakistani extrajudicial prisoners of the United States

See also
 Nasir (name)

Arabic-language surnames
Masculine given names
Arabic masculine given names